Kankartala is a village in Khoyrasol CD Block in Suri Sadar subdivision of Birbhum district in the Indian state of West Bengal.

Geography

Location
Kankartala is part of Barrah gram panchayat. Khoyrasol, the CD block headquarters, and Dubrajpur, the nearest town, are 30 km away from Kankartala. Suri, the district headquarters, is 43 km away.

Police station
Kankartala police station has jurisdiction over a part of Khoyrasol CD block.

Demographics
As per the 2011 Census of India, Kankartala had a total population of 3,390 of which 1,747 (52%) were males and 1,643 (48%) were females. Population below 6 years was 453. The total number of literates in Kankartala was 2,068 (70.41% of the population over 6 years).

Post Office
Kankartala has a delivery branch post office, with PIN 731125, under Khoyrasol sub office and Suri head office. Khoyrasol sub office has the same PIN. Branch offices with the same PIN are Babuijore, Barhara, Bhadulia, Geruapahari, Hazratpur, Jahidpur, Kendragoria, Nabasan, Nakrakonda, Pursundi, Rasa and Sagarbhanga.

References

Villages in Birbhum district